In 2011, 22 albums advanced to number one on the Mega Album Top 100, the official Dutch albums chart. The first album to appear on the Album Top 100 that year was Caro Emerald's Deleted Scenes from the Cutting Room Floor, the last being Christmas by Michael Bublé. Artists and bands who had an album reach number one on the chart for at least one week were Caro Emerald, Los Angeles: The Voices, Marco Borsato, Bruno Mars, Adele, BLØF, Ben Saunders, Guus Meeuwis, Anouk, Amy Winehouse, Red Hot Chili Peppers, Gerard Joling, Gordon, Rene Froger, Jeroen van der Boom, De Toppers, SuperHeavy, De Dijk, Coldplay, Frans Bauer, Snow Patrol, K3, Nick & Simon and Michael Bublé, and out of these artists,  Bruno Mars, BLØF, Ben Saunders, SuperHeavy and Snow Patrol had achieved a number-one album for the first time. Adele's 21 was the best-performing album of 2011, topping the Album Top 100's 2011 year-end chart.

Chart history
Source:

References

See also
2011 in music

Number-one albums
Netherlands Albums
Netherlands 2011